Black Parade may refer to:

 "Black Parade" (song), a 2020 song by Beyoncé
 The Black Parade, a 2006 album by My Chemical Romance
 "Welcome to the Black Parade", lead single from the album
 Black Parade, a 1935 novel by Jack Jones

See also